Cat, in comics, may refer to:

 Tigra (a.k.a. Greer Grant Nelson), a Marvel Comics character whose original superhero identity was the Cat
 Patsy Walker, a Marvel Comics character who inherited the Cat costume and took the name the Hellcat
 Shen Kuei, a Marvel Comics character who also goes by the name the Cat
 Emma Malone, a Marvel UK character who appeared in titles like Gene Dogs
 Cat (Exiles), an alternative version of Kitty Pryde who appeared in the Exiles
 Cat, a character from Cat & Mouse by Aircel Comics
 Cat Grant, a DC Comics character
 An unnamed, red-headed male cat burglar whom Spider-Man has battled twice (the first time in The Amazing Spider-Man #30 (Nov. 1965))

See also
 Cat (disambiguation)
 Catwoman, a DC Comics character
 Cat-Man, a number of comics characters of the same name
 Black Cat (comics), a Marvel Comics character

References